Falakata Railway Station serves the town of Falakata in Alipurduar district in the Indian state of West Bengal. The station lies on the New Jalpaiguri–New Bongaigaon section of Barauni–Guwahati line of Northeast Frontier Railway. The station lies on Alipurduar railway division.

Trains
Major Trains:
Sealdah–Agartala Kanchenjunga Express
Sealdah–Silchar Kanchenjunga Express
Dibrugarh-Howrah Kamrup Express via Guwahati
Dibrugarh–Howrah Kamrup Express Via Rangapara North
Guwahati-Howrah Saraighat Super-fast Express
Sealdah-New Alipurdiar Teesta Torsha Express
Delhi-Dibrugarh Brahmaputra Mail
Sealdah-Bamanhat Uttar Banga Express
New Jalpaiguri - Bongaigaon Express

References

Alipurduar railway division
Railway stations in West Bengal
Railway stations in Alipurduar district